Manipur Baptist Convention (MBC) is a Baptist Christian denomination in Manipur, India. As of 2022, it had 1,449 churches and 221,436 baptized members. It is under the Council of Baptist Churches in Northeast India (CBCNEI). The convention is also a member of Asia Pacific Baptist Federation (APBF) and Baptist World Alliance. The General Secretary of the Manipur Baptist Convention is REV. K. LOSII MAO.

History
Missionary from the American Baptist Mission arrived in Manipur in 1896.  The first converts the missionary had were Tangkhul Nagas. They in turn converted neighboring ethnic tribes to Christianity. In 1903 A. Porom Singh became the first Meitei convert.

Statistics
The statistics for the MBC is given below with the number of churches and number of Baptized Church members only as on 2011.

Communicant members including children and non-baptized family members are not included in the statistics.

See also 

Christianity in Manipur
 Council of Baptist Churches in Northeast India
 North East India Christian Council
 List of Christian denominations in North East India

References 

Christianity in Manipur
Baptist denominations in India
Religious organizations established in 1896
1896 establishments in British India